The Coalition of Asian Pacifics in Entertainment (CAPE) is a 501(c)(3) non-profit organization that advocates for Asian Americans and Pacific Islanders in the entertainment industry. Established in 1991, CAPE "champions diversity by educating, connecting, and empowering Asian American and Pacific Islander artists and leaders in entertainment and media." The organization focuses on training development program and incubators for emerging and mid-level entertainment industry professionals and media consulting and training services.

History 
CAPE was founded in 1991 as a way to connect AAPIs in the entertainment industry by television producer and executive Wenda Fong, publicist Fritz Friedman, and film producer and executive Chris Lee. The organization had few members when it was founded, as there were very few Asian Americans and Pacific Islanders who were very visible in the media. However, since its founding, CAPE has grown to support both new and established actors, writers, directors, producers, agents, and executives. Despite starting small, the CAPE community mobilized through volunteer efforts, and their educational programs and opportunities have helped members develop their careers in the entertainment industry by connecting them to the tools they need to enhance their careers. Additionally, CAPE has been working on developing connections with US and International film industries of China, India, Korea, Japan, Taiwan, and the Philippines.

In 2009, CAPE hired its first staff member in Executive Director, Jennifer Sanderson. It was in 2014 that CAPE moved from being a paid membership-driven organization to a mission-driven organization. The organization decided that in order to fulfill its original goals of serving the artists in the Asian American and Pacific Islander community, they needed to open up their resources to be available to anyone who needed to access them. The same year, Jennifer Sanderson officially stepped down and in 2015, Michelle K. Sugihara took helm and is currently CAPE's Executive Director.

In October 2016, CAPE celebrated its 25th Anniversary. Steven Yeun, Harry Shum Jr., and Constance Wu were some of the many in attendance.

CAPE New Writers Award 
The CAPE New Writers Award was established in 1999 in order to discover and help emerging AAPI writers and artists. Writers submit original works in two categories, film and television. Up to 10 fellows are selected and winners receive a $4,000 prize, a reading of their script, and opportunities to connect with entertainment executives and producers. Notable winners of the fellowship include Alice Wu, Randall Park, Leonard Chang, and Matthew Yang King.

CAPE New Writers Fellowship 
In 2014, CAPE ended their CAPE New Writers Awards competition to move focus move on developmental training and incubation for screenwriters. Founded by Writer-Producer Leo Chu and studio executive Stephen Tao, CAPE's New Writers Fellowship Program is a non-studio professional development program that trains and develops emerging writers to succeed in Hollywood. Participants of the program engage in intensive curriculum training through master classes, panels and workshops featuring professionals in the industry from working screenwriters, development executives, literary agents and managers and more. The program also includes one-on-one script mentoring with a high-level screenwriter-producer. Fellowship winners are presented at an annual graduation event to which members of the Asian American and Pacific Islander entertainment community are invited. 2022 marks a decade of the program.

Alumni of the fellowship include Director-Writer Iram Parveen Bilal, screenwriter-producer Kevin Lau, April Shi and others.

CAPE Leaders Fellowship 
In 2017, CAPE launched the CAPE Leaders Fellowship to develop leadership training to mid-level executives in film and television development, current and production.

CAPE Animation Directors Accelerator 
In 2021, CAPE launched their third program, the CAPE Animation Directors Accelerator under co-chairs Producer Michelle Wong and animation executive Justinian Huang. The program focuses on training animation professionals providing mentorship, panels, workshops and masterclasses with high-level industry execs, producers and creatives in the animation industry.

#IAm campaign 

The #IAm campaign was launched in 2014 as a way to increase visibility and recognition of  Asian Americans and Pacific Islanders. The goal of the campaign was to encourage Asian Americans to share their stories to commemorate Asian Pacific American Heritage Month in May. The campaign consists of an online web series featuring well known actors, musicians, and influential members of the entertainment sector providing stories about their experiences as Asian Americans and Pacific Islanders. The following have been participants of the I Am campaign for the following years:

2014: Amy Hill, Bobby Lee, Brian Tee, Carrie Ann Inaba, Wong Fu Productions (Phillip Wang and Wesley Chan), Christine Ha, David Choi, Harry Shum Jr., Jessica Gomes, Leonardo Nam, Lisa Ling, Melissa Tang, Phil Yu of Angry Asian Man, Randall Park, Kelly Hu, Steven Yeun, Jeremy Lin, Michelle Phan, and Ryan Higa.

2015: Constance Wu, Ki Hong Lee, Daniel Dae Kim, Cassey Ho, Seoul Sausage, Jason Chen, and Arden Cho.

2016: Megan Lee, D-Trix, Ming-Na Wen, and Danny Pudi.

2018: Sandra Oh, Mari Takahashi, Abhijay Prakash, Michelle Kwan, AJ Rafael

2019: Tzi Ma, Apolo Ohno, Ally Maki, Nisha Ganatra, Albert Cheng

References

External links 
 

Asian-American organizations
Entertainment organizations
Organizations established in 1991
1991 establishments in the United States